Vodka Rain is a South Korean indie band that formed in 2005. The band signed to MUSICABAL and released their debut album The Wonder Years in 2007. The band's current members include Ahn Seung-joon, Lee Hae-wan, Joo Yoon-ha, and Seo Sang-joon.

Band members 
 Ahn Seung Joon - Vocals 
 Lee Hae-wan - Guitar
 Joo Yoon-ha - Bass
 Seo Sang-joon - Drums

Discography

Vodka Rain

 1집 The Wonder Years (2007)
 Vodka Rain (2007)
 2집 Flavor (2008)
 숙취 (2009)
 이분쉼표 (2009)
 3집 Faint (2010)

Compilation albums

 MBC 음악여행 라라라 Live Vol.10 (2010)
 SAVe tHE AiR Green Concert (2011)
 Found Tracks Vol.5 (2011)

Controversy 
In 2011, Vodka Rain's "Night Time Restaurant" was banned by the Ministry of Gender Equality and Family. Vodka Rain and several other indie bands entered a class action lawsuit against the Ministry of Gender Equality and Family to return their songs to the market.

References

South Korean rock music groups
2005 establishments in South Korea
Musical groups established in 2005